This is a list of properties and districts in Lowndes County, Georgia that are listed on the National Register of Historic Places (NRHP).

Current listings

|}

References

Lowndes County, Georgia
Lowndes
Buildings and structures in Lowndes County, Georgia